HMS Tartar (F133) was a  of the Royal Navy (RN). She was named after the Tartar people, most of whom were located in Asia and Eastern Europe. She was sold to the Indonesian Navy in 1984 as KRI Hasanuddin (333).

Tartar was built by Devonport Dockyard, at a cost of £4,140,000. She was launched on 19 September 1960 and commissioned on 26 February 1962.

Service history

Royal Navy

While in the West Indies in 1963, Tartar provided support to Trinidad after Hurricane Flora struck the Caribbean. In early December, Tartars crew apprehended nine armed Cubans on board a ship off Cay Sal, Bahamas, where an arms cache was discovered by a ship's party.

Tartar was recommissioned on 12 January 1967 and attended Portsmouth Navy Days later that year. The frigate arrived in the Persian Gulf in 1968 via Simonstown, Mombasa and the Seychelles.

On 29 March 1968, Tartar and the amphibious assault vessel  were deployed to patrol off the Greater and Lesser Tunbs, small islands in the Persian Gulf, to deter Iran from occupying the islands. Between 1969 and 1971 she was commanded by Captain Cameron Rusby. On the voyage to the Seychelles the fleet auxiliary vessel  was lost, having struck a submerged object. Service in the Gulf was followed by a homeward journey via the Beira Patrol lasting six weeks and Cape Town thence to Gibraltar arriving during the talks between Harold Wilson, Prime Minister and Ian Smith from Rhodesia on board the cruiser .

In 1975, Tartar undertook fishery protection duties in the Barents Sea. She supported operations during the Third Cod War with Iceland. In total, Tartar spent six weeks on fisheries protection patrols in the Third Cod War, and was involved in four collisions. Later that year, in the West Indies, Tartar searched for and located the wreckage of Cubana Flight 455. She was present at the Spithead Fleet Review in 1977, held in honour of Queen Elizabeth II's Silver Jubilee. At this time she was part of the 1st Frigate Squadron.

Tartar was reduced to reserve in 1980, being placed in the Standby Squadron. She was taken out of reserve during the Falklands War and restored for active service. The frigate did not deploy to the South Atlantic, however, instead operating in home waters in the absence of other warships. She did deploy to the West Indies as a guardship in 1982/1983 for 3 months, spending Christmas and New Year in St Petersburg, Florida. In June 1983, Tartars Westland Wasp helicopter evacuated the six-man crew of the supply ship , which had collided with an oil rig in the English Channel. As a potential hazard to navigation, Spearfish had to be sunk by the guns of Tartar.

Indonesian Navy
Tartar was decommissioned in March 1984 and sold to Indonesia. After a refit at Vosper Thornycroft's Woolston, Southampton shipyard, the ship was delivered on 22 January 1986 and was commissioned into the Indonesian Navy on 3 April 1986, with the name KRI Hasanuddin, so named after a sultan who fought the Dutch. The frigate was stricken in 2000 and her name was given to a Dutch-built .

References

Publications

Gardiner, Robert & Chesneau, Roger (1995), Conway's All the World's Fighting Ships 1947–1995, Conway Maritime Press, London, .

Marriott, Leo, 1983.  Royal Navy Frigates 1945–1983, Ian Allan Ltd.  
 
 

Tribal-class frigates
Ships built in Plymouth, Devon
1960 ships
Ships of the Fishery Protection Squadron of the United Kingdom
Khristina Tiyahahu-class frigates